Alessandro Bianchi (born 28 January 1945 in Rome) is an Italian academic and politician, best known for having formerly served as Minister of Transport from 2006 to 2008.

A registered member of the Italian Communist Party until its disbandment, Bianchi is currently professor of Urban planning at the Faculty of Architecture of University of Reggio Calabria. He was part of the Prodi II Cabinet from 17 May 2006 to 8 May 2008; his name was chosen by a list of prominent left-wing independent people proposed by the Party of Italian Communists. However, he never took membership of such party and instead opted to join the Democratic Party in March 2008.

He is member of Real Academia de Ciencias Económicas y Financieras, Spain, since 2007.

References

Academic staff of the Mediterranea University of Reggio Calabria
1945 births
Politicians from Rome
Living people
Italian Communist Party politicians
20th-century Italian politicians
Transport ministers of Italy